L71 may refer to:
California City Municipal Airport's FAA location identifier;
Zeppelin LZ 113's tactical numbering.